Veronika Honkasalo (born 7 July 1975 in Lappeenranta) is a Finnish politician currently serving in the Parliament of Finland for the Left Alliance at the Helsinki constituency.

Academic career 
She earned a doctorate in social sciences in 2012 and was appointed an associate professor in 2018. She is a researcher at the Youth Research Society and has published several papers on youth related research.

Political career 
She has entered the city council of Helsinki in 2012 and was elected to the Finnish parliament in 2019.

Political positions 
She is opposed to what the Palestinians being forcibly expelled from their land for making way for Israeli settlements and introduced a motion proposing an import ban on products produced by the inhabitants of such settlements in accordance with Article 49 of the Geneva Convention.

References

1975 births
Living people
People from Lappeenranta
Left Alliance (Finland) politicians
Members of the Parliament of Finland (2019–23)
21st-century Finnish women politicians
Women members of the Parliament of Finland